Natalya Nikolaevna Ivanova (born 25 June 1981) is a Russian hurdler. She finished fifth in the 400m hurdles final at the 2006 European Athletics Championships in Gothenburg.

She also ran in the heats for Russia's 4 × 400 m relay team in the 2004 Olympics. This entitled her to a silver medal, despite not competing in the final where Russia finished second.

Achievements

Personal bests
200 metres - 22.97 s (2005)
400 metres - 50.79 s (2004)
400 metres hurdles - 54.36 s (2007)

References

1981 births
Living people
Russian female hurdlers
Russian female sprinters
Athletes (track and field) at the 2004 Summer Olympics
Olympic athletes of Russia
Olympic silver medalists for Russia
Athletes from Moscow
European Athletics Championships medalists
Olympic silver medalists in athletics (track and field)
Universiade medalists in athletics (track and field)
Universiade gold medalists for Russia
Medalists at the 2004 Summer Olympics
Medalists at the 2005 Summer Universiade
21st-century Russian women